Houari Baouche (born 24 December 1995) is an Algerian professional footballer who plays as a left back for USM Alger in the Algerian Ligue Professionnelle 1.

Career
In 2016, Baouche signed a contract with ES Mostaganem.

In 2017, Baouche signed a contract with O Médéa.

In 2019, Baouche signed a contract with CA Bordj Bou Arréridj.

In 2020, Baouche signed a two-year contract with USM Bel-Abbès.

In 2021, Baouche signed a two-year contract with USM Alger.

References

External links
 

1995 births
Living people
Algerian footballers
Association football fullbacks
USM Alger players
USM Bel Abbès players
CA Bordj Bou Arréridj players
Olympique de Médéa players
ES Mostaganem players
21st-century Algerian people
2022 African Nations Championship players
Algeria A' international footballers